The following is a list of all the squads of the national teams that participated in the 2019 FIFA U-20 World Cup. Each team had to name a preliminary squad of between 22 and 50 players. From the preliminary squad, the team had to name a final squad of 21 players (three of whom must be goalkeepers) by the FIFA deadline. Players in the final squad could be replaced by a player from the preliminary squad due to serious injury or illness up to 24 hours prior to kickoff of the team's first match. Players born on or after 1 January 1999 and on or before 31 December 2003 were eligible to compete in the tournament.

The nationality for each club reflects the national association (not the league) to which the club is affiliated. A flag is included for coaches that are of a different nationality than their own national team. Those marked in bold have been capped at full International level.

Group A

Poland 
Head coach: Jacek Magiera

The final squad was announced on 13 April.

Colombia 
Head coach: Arturo Reyes

The final squad was announced on 29 April. Yéiler Góez was replaced by Andrés Perea on 15 May due to injury.

Tahiti 
Head coach: Bruno Tehaamoana

The final squad was announced on 28 April.

Senegal 
Head coach: Youssouph Dabo

The final squad was announced on 13 May.

Group B

Mexico 
Head coach: Diego Ramírez

The final squad was announced on 23 April.

Italy 
Head coach: Paolo Nicolato

The final squad was announced on 14 April.

Japan 
Head coach: Masanaga Kageyama

The final squad was announced on 7 May.

Ecuador 
Head coach:  Jorge Célico

The final squad was announced on 25 April.

Group C

Honduras 
Head coach: Carlos Tábora

The final squad was announced on 4 May.

New Zealand 
Head coach:  Des Buckingham

The final squad was announced on 16 April 2019.

Uruguay 
Head coach: Gustavo Ferreyra

The final squad was announced on 6 May 2019.

Norway 
Head coach: Pål Arne Johansen

The final squad was announced on 30 April 2019.

Group D

Qatar 
Head coach:  Bruno Pinheiro

Nigeria 
Head coach: Paul Aigbogun

The final squad was announced on 13 May 2019.

Ukraine 
Head coach: Oleksandr Petrakov

The 25-man provisional squad was announced on 7 May 2019. Vitaliy Mykolenko was replaced by Oleh Veremiyenko on 23 May due to injury.

United States 
Head coach: Tab Ramos

The 21-man final squad was announced on 10 May. Ayo Akinola was replaced by Julián Araujo on 22 May due to injury.

Group E

Panama 
Head coach: Jorge Dely Valdés

The 23-man provisional squad was announced on 29 April 2019.

Mali 
Head coach: Mamoutou Kane

France 
Head coach: Bernard Diomède

The final squad was announced on 13 May 2019.

Saudi Arabia 
Head coach: Khaled Al-Atwi

Group F

Portugal 
Head coach: Hélio Sousa

The 22-man provisional squad was announced on 10 May 2019.

South Korea 
Head coach: Chung Jung-yong

The final squad was announced on 2 May 2019. On 12 May, Lee Kyu-hyuk was announced as a replacement for Jeong Woo-yeong after Bayern Munich declined to release him.

Argentina 
Head coach: Fernando Batista

The final squad was announced on 3 May 2019.

South Africa 
Head coach: Thabo Senong

The final squad was announced on 14 May 2019.

Notes

References

FIFA U-20 World Cup squads
squads